Imbert Maurits Jebbink (born 8 December 1946) is a retired field hockey player from the Netherlands. He competed at the 1976 Olympics and 1978 World Cup, where his teams finished in fourth and second place, respectively.

Between 1976 and 1978 Jebbink played 29 international matches and scored no goals.

References

External links
 

1946 births
Living people
Dutch male field hockey players
Olympic field hockey players of the Netherlands
Field hockey players at the 1976 Summer Olympics
Sportspeople from Hengelo
1978 Men's Hockey World Cup players
20th-century Dutch people
21st-century Dutch people